Tapinella is a genus of thick barklice in the family Pachytroctidae. There are at least 40 described species in Tapinella.

Species
These 41 species belong to the genus Tapinella:

 Tapinella aliena (Banks, N., 1941) c g
 Tapinella baliensis Thornton, 1984 c g
 Tapinella bannana Li, Fasheng, 1992 c g
 Tapinella bicolorata Garcia Aldrete, 1993 c g
 Tapinella campanensis New & Thornton, 1981 c g
 Tapinella candida New, 1974 c g
 Tapinella castanea Pearman, J. V., 1932 c g
 Tapinella chamelana Badonnel, 1986 c g
 Tapinella clypeola Thornton, 1984 c g
 Tapinella columbiana Badonnel, 1986 c g
 Tapinella curvata Badonnel, 1949 c g
 Tapinella curvatoides Smithers, Courtenay, 1995 c g
 Tapinella dichromoptera Badonnel, 1988 c g
 Tapinella eocenica New, 2005 c g
 Tapinella fasciata Thornton & Wong, 1966 c g
 Tapinella formosana Enderlein, 1908 c g
 Tapinella francesca Thornton & A. K. T. Woo, 1973 c g
 Tapinella fusca Badonnel, 1977 c g
 Tapinella gamma Mockford, 1991 c g
 Tapinella glyptops Badonnel, 1976 c g
 Tapinella huangi Li, Fasheng, 2002 c g
 Tapinella levuka Thornton, 1981 c g
 Tapinella maculata Mockford & Gurney, 1956 i c g b
 Tapinella madagascariensis Badonnel, 1967 c g
 Tapinella maracana Mockford, 1991 c g
 Tapinella mariana Thornton, S. S. Lee & Chui, 1972 c g
 Tapinella nebulosa Vaughan, Thornton & New, 1991 c g
 Tapinella negreai (Badonnel, 1977) c g
 Tapinella olmeca Mockford, 1975 c g
 Tapinella ornaticeps Mockford, 1991 c g
 Tapinella picta (Badonnel, 1986) c g
 Tapinella picticeps Badonnel, 1977 c g
 Tapinella pictipenna Thornton, S. S. Lee & Chui, 1972 c g
 Tapinella qutangxiana Li, Fasheng, 1997 c g
 Tapinella spinosa Thornton, 1984 c g
 Tapinella squamosa Badonnel, 1955 c g
 Tapinella stenomedia Thornton & A. K. T. Woo, 1973 c g
 Tapinella trilineata Badonnel, 1983 c g
 Tapinella tuila Thornton, 1981 c g
 Tapinella unicolorata Turner, B. D., 1975 c g
 Tapinella vittata Garcia Aldrete, 1993 c g

Data sources: i = ITIS, c = Catalogue of Life, g = GBIF, b = Bugguide.net

References

Lienhard, C. & Smithers, C. N. 2002. Psocoptera (Insecta): World Catalogue and Bibliography. Instrumenta Biodiversitatis, vol. 5. Muséum d'histoire naturelle, Genève.

Further reading

External links

 tapinella on www.organismnames.com

Pachytroctidae
Psocoptera genera